The Middle East South Asia Conference (MESAC) is an athletic and academic conference consisting of six international schools in the Middle East and India. The conference was formed in 2010 for the purpose of creating a smaller, more intimate medium for athletic and academic competitions compared to the conference's predecessor, EMAC. Events are hosted at one of the conference's six schools in India, Oman, Qatar, and the UAE. From 2017 to 2019, students from the American School of Doha couldn't travel to the UAE, and as a result could not attend any of the events hosted in the UAE schools.

Member Schools 

Current members:

American British Academy - Oman
American Community School of Abu Dhabi - UAE
American Embassy School - India
American School of Doha - Qatar
American School of Dubai - UAE
Dubai American Academy - UAE

Former members:

Cairo American College - Egypt

Events 

Teams are usually divided into Junior Varsity (grades 8-10) and Varsity (grades 11-12) divisions, with each competing at its own MESAC athletic event. Most of the sporting events are also divided in Boys and Girls events. In addition, most events include both a Boys and Girls tournament at the same level. There are Fine Arts events where all the schools associated with MESAC come together to perform and display several works of art. The events that are performed are: choir songs, band instrumentals and a drama piece. A few visual art pieces are displayed too.

In rare occasions (if the athlete is good enough and aged 16 or older) 9th and 10th graders are allowed to play varsity. All athletes over the age of 17, however, are required to play at the varsity level. Events represented in MESAC competitions (by season) are:

Fall

Academic Games
Golf
Swimming
Volleyball

Winter

Basketball
Cross-Country
Fine Arts
Soccer/Football
Tennis

Spring

Badminton
Baseball/Softball
Forensics/Debate
Track and Field

References

Sports leagues established in 2010
High school sports
Sports organizations of Asia
Sports associations